Goldeneye is the original name of novelist Ian Fleming's estate on Oracabessa Bay on the northern coastline of Jamaica. He bought  adjacent to the Golden Clouds estate in 1946 and built his home on the edge of a cliff overlooking a private beach. The three-bedroom structure was constructed from Fleming's sketch, fitted with wooden jalousie windows and a swimming pool. Fleming's visitors at Goldeneye included actors, musicians, and filmmakers.  the property operates as Goldeneye Hotel and Resort, consisting of Fleming's main house and several cottages.

The estate is located in the Oracabessa Bay Fish Sanctuary, established in 2011 to protect the area's marine ecosystem. It is adjacent to James Bond Beach.

History

In spite of its obvious proximity to Golden Clouds, Fleming claimed a number of origins for the name Goldeneye, including Carson McCullers's 1941 novel, Reflections in a Golden Eye and Operation Goldeneye, a Second World War era contingency plan Fleming had developed in case of a Nazi invasion of Gibraltar through Spain.

Fleming joined The Sunday Times in 1946, for which he oversaw the paper's worldwide network of correspondents. He negotiated a contract whereby he could spend three months of each year at Goldeneye. Here he entertained Ann Fleming. Ann was then married to Lord Rothermere, who thought Ann was staying with Noël Coward. 

On 17 February 1952, Fleming began writing his first Bond novel, Casino Royale, at Goldeneye. For the next twelve years, Fleming wrote all his Bond stories there. A number of the Bond movies, including Dr. No and Live and Let Die, were filmed near the estate.

In 1956 British Prime Minister Sir Anthony Eden and his wife Clarissa spent a month at Goldeneye after Eden's health collapsed in the wake of the Suez Crisis. The attendant publicity helped to boost Fleming's writing career.

In 1976, twelve years after Ian Fleming's death, the property was sold to reggae musician Bob Marley. A year later he sold the estate to Island Records founder Chris Blackwell. As it grew, he also added various cottages and huts around an inner lagoon sandwiched between James Bond Beach and Low Cay Beach. In the late 1980s, he formed the Island Outpost Company and opened the property as a small hotel.

The name Goldeneye has found its way into the James Bond film and television franchises. It was used in the 1991 animated series James Bond Jr, where it became the name of a valuable pendant worn by a prince in the episode "Ship of Terror". It was more famously used again in 1995, when GoldenEye became the title of the seventeenth James Bond film, the first to star Pierce Brosnan, and in the 1997 video game GoldenEye 007; the plot of both revolve around the eponymous weapons program which entails the use of satellites to generate a nuclear electromagnetic pulse.

Hotel and resort

Rather than a traditional hotel, Goldeneye resort is a compound of tropical buildings, gardens and private beaches. It closed in 2007 for major additions and renovations, and reopened in December 2010.

Guests
Fleming's Goldeneye became the social epicenter of Jamaica's north coast along with nearby Firefly owned by Noël Coward, and Bolt House, owned by Chris Blackwell's mother, Blanche, who was a long time friend of Fleming. The property was equally popular with a coterie of Hollywood stars and British literary greats as it was British aristocrats and international heads of state. Errol Flynn, Lucian Freud, Truman Capote, Patrick Leigh Fermor, the Duchess of Devonshire, Princess Margaret, and Prime Minister Anthony Eden were all visitors. 

The Goldeneye of the Blackwell era has also attracted celebrities, both as his friends and resort guests, among them Grace Jones, Bono, Naomi Campbell, Michael Caine, Pierce Brosnan, Harrison Ford, Johnny Depp, Kate Moss, and Richard Branson. Sting wrote "Every Breath You Take" at Fleming's writing desk while vacationing on the estate in 1982.

Garden
A tradition, which was started by Sir Anthony Eden when he and his wife, Clarissa, planted a Santa Maria tree before departing from Goldeneye, is still ongoing. Today, there are hundreds of mango, lime, orange and ackee trees in the garden. Each was planted by a guest, and has a small plaque saying who planted it and when. A $1,000 required donation goes to the Oracabessa Foundation.

See also
List of hotels in Jamaica

References

Further reading

External links
Aerial view
Ian Fleming's Jamaica: Goldeneye
Oracabessa Website
Goldeneye About Us
Fleming Villa Website

Hotels in Jamaica
Ian Fleming
Buildings and structures in Saint Mary Parish, Jamaica
Anthony Eden
Bob Marley